Pallaruelo de Monegros is a locality  in the municipality of Sariñena, in Huesca province, Aragon, Spain. As of 2020, it had a population of 99.

Geography 
Pallaruelo de Monegros is located 69km south-southeast of Huesca.

References

Populated places in the Province of Huesca